TSF may refer to:

Broadcasting
 TSF (radio station), a Portuguese radio station
 TSF Jazz, a French jazz radio station, previously known as TSF
 Télécoms Sans Frontières, a humanitarian organization specializing in emergency telecommunications
 Tip-sleeve (TS) female audio jack

Computing
 Text Services Framework, a COM framework and API in Windows XP and later Windows operating systems
 Timing synchronization function, in IEEE 802.11 wireless local area network (WLAN) standard to fulfill timing synchronization among users

Medicine
 Taylor Spatial Frame, an external fixator for treating fractures
 Triceps skin fold, a measurement of the upper arm

Other
 Taoyuan Sports Federation, a sport organization in Taiwan
 The Sauce Factory, an independent record label founded by American rapper Sauce Walka
 The Stafford Foundation, a non-profit organization
 Treviso Airport, IATA airport code
 Tactical Surface Fighter, a kind of mecha from the series Muv-Luv
 Tons per square foot, pressure unit
 Turkish Chess Federation